Guégon is a commune in the Morbihan department of Brittany in north-western France.

Demographics
Inhabitants of Guégon are called in French Guégonnais.

Breton language
In 2008, 35.21% of the children in Guégon attended the French-Breton bilingual schools for primary education.

See also
Communes of the Morbihan department

References

External links

 Mayors of Morbihan Association 

Communes of Morbihan